Harry Higgs (born December 4, 1991) is an American professional golfer who plays on the PGA Tour.

Early life
Higgs was born in Camden, New Jersey on December 4, 1991. He grew up in Overland Park, Kansas. His parents are Mike and Denise Higgs.

Amateur career
He played his high school golf at Blue Valley North High School in Overland Park, Kansas and his college golf for the SMU Mustangs.

Professional career
Higgs played on PGA Tour Latinoamérica in 2015 and 2018. He won the Diners Club Peru Open in 2018 and led the Order of Merit, securing a tour card on the 2019 Korn Ferry Tour.

Higgs won the Price Cutter Charity Championship on the 2019 Korn Ferry Tour. This led him to a 5th-place finish in the regular season standings, which earned him his tour card for the 2019–20 PGA Tour season. He finished second at the Bermuda Championship in November 2019. He also finished second at the 2020 Safeway Open.

In May 2021, Higgs played in his first major tournament, the 2021 PGA Championship at the Ocean Course at Kiawah Island Golf Resort. He shot a bogey-free round on the final day to finish tied for fourth. This finish got him into the field for the 2022 Masters Tournament.

Personal life
Higgs' younger brother, Alex, used to be a professional golfer but is now a caddie. Both played college golf at Southern Methodist University. Alex caddied for Harry when Harry was a senior at SMU.

Professional wins (2)

Korn Ferry Tour wins (1)

PGA Tour Latinoamérica wins (1)

Results in major championships

"T" = tied

Results in The Players Championship

CUT = missed the halfway cut
"T" indicates a tie for a place

Team appearances
Aruba Cup (representing PGA Tour Latinoamérica): 2018 (winners, playing captain)

See also
2019 Korn Ferry Tour Finals graduates

References

External links
 
 

American male golfers
SMU Mustangs men's golfers
PGA Tour Latinoamérica golfers
PGA Tour golfers
Korn Ferry Tour graduates
Golfers from New Jersey
Golfers from Kansas
Golfers from Dallas
Sportspeople from Camden, New Jersey
Sportspeople from Overland Park, Kansas
1991 births
Living people